The following is a list of the 21 cantons of the Yonne department, in France, following the French canton reorganisation which came into effect in March 2015:

 Auxerre-1
 Auxerre-2
 Auxerre-3
 Auxerre-4
 Avallon
 Brienon-sur-Armançon
 Chablis
 Charny Orée de Puisaye
 Cœur de Puisaye
 Gâtinais en Bourgogne
 Joigny
 Joux-la-Ville
 Migennes
 Pont-sur-Yonne
 Saint-Florentin
 Sens-1
 Sens-2
 Thorigny-sur-Oreuse
 Tonnerrois
 Villeneuve-sur-Yonne
 Vincelles

References